The following is a list of Nippon Professional Baseball players with the last name starting with D, retired or active.

D
Takenori Daita
Masaaki Daitoh
Yu Darvish
Romash Tasuku Dass
Masashi Date
Jack Daugherty
Tom Davey
Dick Davis
Glenn Davis
Scott Davison
Fernando de la Cruz
Francisco de la Cruz
Luis de los Santos
Yudai Deguchi
Miguel Del Toro
Tomás de la Rosa
Shane Dennis
Orestes Destrade
Eddy Díaz
Felix Diaz
Joselo Díaz
Rafael Díaz
Joe Dillon
Katsuyuki Dobashi
Masayuki Dobashi
Kenta Doi
Kiyoshi Doi
Masahiro Doi
Ryotaro Doi
Shozo Doi
Yoshihiro Doi
Chris Donnels
Naomichi Donoue
Takehiro Donoue
David Doster
Sean Douglass
Travis Driskill
Rob Ducey
Mariano Duncan

References

External links
Japanese Baseball

 D